The New Germantown Covered Bridge is a historic wooden covered bridge located at Jackson Township, near New Germantown in Perry County, Pennsylvania. It is a  King post bridge, constructed in 1891.  It crosses Sherman Creek.

It was listed on the National Register of Historic Places in 1980.

References 

Covered bridges on the National Register of Historic Places in Pennsylvania
Covered bridges in Perry County, Pennsylvania
Bridges completed in 1891
Wooden bridges in Pennsylvania
Bridges in Perry County, Pennsylvania
Tourist attractions in Perry County, Pennsylvania
1891 establishments in Pennsylvania
National Register of Historic Places in Perry County, Pennsylvania
Road bridges on the National Register of Historic Places in Pennsylvania